The World of Abbott and Costello is a 1965 American compilation film starring the comedy team of Abbott and Costello.

Plot
This film is a compilation of scenes from eighteen films that Abbott and Costello made for Universal Pictures between 1941 and 1955. Comedian Jack E. Leonard provides the narration for the film, which incorporates scenes from the following films:

Abbott and Costello Go to Mars, directed by Charles Lamont
Abbott and Costello in the Foreign Legion, directed by Charles Lamont
Abbott and Costello Meet Frankenstein, directed by Charles Barton
Abbott and Costello Meet the Keystone Kops, directed by Charles Lamont
Abbott and Costello Meet the Mummy, directed by Charles Lamont
Buck Privates, directed by Arthur Lubin
Buck Privates Come Home, directed by Charles Barton
Comin' Round The Mountain, directed by Charles Lamont
Hit The Ice, directed by Charles Lamont
In Society, directed by Jean Yarbrough
In The Navy, directed by Arthur Lubin
The Wistful Widow of Wagon Gap, directed by Charles Barton
Little Giant, directed by William A. Seiter
Lost in Alaska, directed by Jean Yarbrough
Mexican Hayride, directed by Charles Barton
The Naughty Nineties, directed by Jean Yarbrough
Ride 'Em Cowboy, directed by Arthur Lubin
Who Done It?, directed by Erle C. Kenton

Prior compilation appearance
A year earlier, MGM Pictures released a compilation film, MGM's Big Parade of Comedy, which includes a scene from the Abbott and Costello film, Rio Rita.

Release
The World of Abbott and Costello was theatrically released by Universal Pictures in 1965 as part of a double feature with McHale's Navy Joins the Air Force.

Home media
The film has been released twice on DVD:  the first time, on The Best of Abbott and Costello Volume Four, on October 4, 2005, and again on October 28, 2008 as a bonus feature in the Abbott and Costello: The Complete Universal Pictures Collection.

See also
List of American films of 1965

References

External links

1965 films
1965 comedy films
Abbott and Costello films
American black-and-white films
Compilation films
Universal Pictures films
1960s English-language films
1960s American films